This is a list of the named lochs of Orkney, Scotland. There are numerous lochs, both large and small, scattered across the islands of this archipelago

List of lochs, island by island

Burray
Echna Loch

Eday
Loch of Bomo (diminutive lochan)
Loch of Carrick
Loch of Doomy
Loch of London
Mill Loch

Egilsay
Manse Loch
Loch of Watten
Loch of Welland

Holm of Huip
Veltieskerry Loch

Hoy
Berry Lochs (two lochans in southwest)
Heldale Water (largest loch on Hoy)
Hoglinns Water (second largest loch on Hoy)
Kit Loch (diminutive lochan)
Lint Lochs (diminutive lochans)
Loch of Greenhill (lochan on South Walls)
Loomi Shuns (diminutive lochans in southwest)
Muckle Lochs (series of lochans east of Withi Gill)
Rotten Loch (diminutive lochan in far south)
Sands Water
Sandy Loch (reservoir)
Loch of Stourdale (diminutive lochan near Rora Head)
Lochs of Withigill (series of lochans on Withi Gill)
Water of Hoy (beside B9407 at Lyrawa Hill)
Water of the Wicks (east of Water of Hoy)

Mainland
Loch of Ayre
Loch of Banks
 Loch of Boardhouse
 Loch of Bosquoy
Loch of Brockan
Loch of Carness
Loch of Clumly
Loch of Graemeshall
Lochs of Griffyelt (three small lochans near Greenigoe)
 Loch of Harray
Loch of Hestecruive
 Loch of Hundland
Loch of Isbister
 Loch of Kirbister
Loch of Lakequoy
Looma Shun (lochan south of Georth)
Lowrie's Water (lochan on Burgar Hill)
Mill Dam of Rango
Loch of Ouse (lochan in Deerness)
Peerie Sea (Kirkwall)
Peerie Water (lochan in north)
Loch of Rosemire (lochan west of Dounby)
Loch of Sabiston
The Shunan (lochan southeast of Dounby)
 Loch of Skaill
 Loch of Stenness
Stromness Reservoir (artificial waterbody)
 Loch of Tankerness
 Loch of Swannay
Loch of Wasdale

North Ronaldsay
Ancum Loch
Dennis Loch
Loch of Garso
Loch Gretchen
Hooking Loch (largest loch on North Ronaldsay)
Trolla Vatn

Papa Westray
Loch of Hyndgreenie
Loch of Ness
Loch of St Tredwell

Rousay
Loch of Jan Janet (diminutive lochan)
Loch of Knitchen
Loch of Loomachun
Loch of Moan (diminutive lochan in northwest)
Muckle Water
Peerie Water
Loch of Quoys (diminutive lochan in east)
Loch of Scockness
Loch of Wasbister
Loch of Wasday (diminutive lochan beneath Ward Hill)
Loch of Withamo (diminutive lochan on Kierfea Hill)

Sanday
Bea Loch
Loch of Brue
Loch of Langamay
North Loch
Roos Loch
Loch of Rummie
Westayre Loch

Shapinsay
Lairo Water
Loch of Sandside
Little Vasa Water
Vasa Loch
Loch of Westhill

South Ronaldsay
Gairy Lochs
Graemston Loch
Liddel Loch
Loch of Lythe
Sounds Loch
Trena Loch

Stronsay
Blan Water
Bruce's Loch
Gricey Water
Lea Shun
Little Water
Loch of Matpow
Meikle Water
Mill Loch
Loch of Rothiesholm
Straenia Water

Swona
Loch of the Tarf

Westray
Loch of Burness
Craig Loch
Muckle Water (lochan in south)
Loch Saintear
Loch of the Stack (near Noup Head)
Loch of Swartmill

Wyre
Loch of Oorns (bog)
Loch of the Taing

References

Ordnance Survey 1:25,000 scale Explorer map sheet numbers 461 to 465

Northern Isles

Lochs
Lochs, Orkney